Cristian Matei (born May 8, 1977) is a Romanian composer.  Matei graduated from the National University of Music Bucharest with a Master of Fine Arts in Jazz-Pop Music Composition. He is a member of Union of Composers and Musicologists from Romania.

Discography

Film 
Dupa Ea, director Cristina Ionescu, 2007.
Daca Îngerii ar putea vedea, director Mihnea Chelaru, 2009
Black Sunday, director Mihnea Chelaru, 2010.
La Frontieră, director Cătălin Dupu, 2010
The 10nd, director Diana Grigoriu, 2011

Theatre 
Amadeus by Peter Scheffer, director Toma Enache
Female Sect, director Toma Enache
England And Chicken Pox by D.R.Popescu, producer Vasile Manta.
The Adventures Of Burattino, producer Vasile Manta.
Donkey Skin, producer Vasile Manta.
King-Limir, producer Leonard Popovici.
Snow Girl, producer Vasile Manta.
The Prince From Deep Within The Earth, producer Leonard Popovici.
Snow White, musical by Puşa Roth.
Barbiero Di Sevilla, producer Toma Enache.
The Master Cat, musical by Puşa Roth.

Projects 
Nobody Steals The Sun, science & music I.
Perseids, science & music II.

References

External links 
Official website - Cristian Matei 

1977 births
Romanian composers
Living people